Audie N. Cornish (born October 9, 1979) is an American journalist and a former co-host of NPR's All Things Considered.  She was previously the host of Profile by Buzzfeed News, a web-only interview show that lasted one season, as well as NPR Presents, a long-form conversation series with creatives about their projects, processes, and shaping culture in America.

Early life and education
Cornish was born in Randolph, Massachusetts to Jamaican parents. 

She graduated from Randolph High School. She subsequently graduated from the University of Massachusetts-Amherst with a journalism degree. During her years there, she interned with NPR and worked with campus radio station WMUA.

Career
Previous jobs include reporting for the NPR station WBUR, for the Associated Press in Boston, and for NPR on 10 southern states and Capitol Hill issues. She shared the 2005 first prize in the National Awards for Education Writing for a study of the achievement gap between races. She is a member of the National Association of Black Journalists.

Weekend Edition and All Things Considered
 On September 4, 2011, Cornish replaced Liane Hansen on NPR's Weekend Edition Sunday. Hansen had served as host of the show for more than 20 years.

At the end of the December 18, 2011, broadcast of Weekend Edition, Cornish announced that she would be leaving the program in January 2012 to co-host All Things Considered during the 2012 election year, to be replaced on January 8 by Rachel Martin. It was subsequently reported that the change was due to Michele Norris's decision to step down from All Things Considered during the 2012 election year because her husband had taken a position in the Obama re-election campaign. On January 3, 2013, NPR announced that Cornish would remain the host of the show and that Norris would instead return as a special correspondent.

In August 2017, Cornish announced that she would take leave from NPR during her maternity leave. During her leave, she published occasional interviews in The New York Times Magazine. All Things Considered has an audience of 14 million listeners per week.

On January 4, 2022, Cornish announced her resignation from NPR to join The Great Resignation and "try something new." Co-host Ari Shapiro noted that NPR is "hemorrhaging hosts from marginalized backgrounds." Cornish's exit follows the recent departure of NPR hosts Noel King and Lulu Garcia-Navarro, all of whom are persons of color.

Other projects 
From 2018 to 2019, Cornish hosted Profile, a Buzzfeed News interview TV show released exclusively on Facebook. This show was funded by Facebook as part of the social platform’s push into investing in video news programming through its Facebook Watch platform. Each episode of Profile featured "a different newsmaker each week, giving viewers a chance to hear from the biggest names in politics, tech, business, and entertainment."

Following her resignation from NPR in early 2022, Cornish tweeted, "I look forward to new opportunities and new ways to tell stories and to keep finding ways to make space and center the voices of those who have been traditionally left out." On January 10, 2022, it was announced that Cornish joined CNN+ to host a weekly show. 

On November 17, 2022, Cornish’s  weekly podcast The Assignment, with Audie Cornish released its premier episode.  On The Assignment, Audie Cornish “pulls listeners out of their digital echo chambers to hear from the people who live the headlines. From the sex work economy to the battle over what's taught in classrooms, no topic is off the table.”

Personal life
Audie Cornish is married to the author of Hellfire Boys: The Birth of the U.S. Chemical Warfare Service and the Race for the Worlds Deadliest Weapons, Theo Emery. She has two children and often speaks about the challenges of balancing work and family life.

References

External links

Living people
1979 births
African-American women journalists
African-American journalists
American people of Jamaican descent
NPR personalities
People from Randolph, Massachusetts
People from Montgomery County, Maryland
University of Massachusetts Amherst alumni
21st-century American journalists
Journalists from Massachusetts
Journalists from Maryland
21st-century American women
21st-century African-American women
21st-century African-American people
20th-century African-American people
20th-century African-American women